Tiger Love is a 1924 American drama silent film directed by George Melford, written by Manuel Penella, Howard Hawks, and Julie Herne, and starring Antonio Moreno, Estelle Taylor, G. Raymond Nye, Manuel Caméré, Edgar Norton, David Torrence, and Snitz Edwards. It was released on June 30, 1924, by Paramount Pictures.

Tiger Love is a lost film.

Cast 
Antonio Moreno as The Wildcat
Estelle Taylor as Marcheta
G. Raymond Nye as El Pezuño
Manuel Caméré as Don Ramon
Edgar Norton as Don Victoriano Fuestes
David Torrence as Don Miguel Castelar
Snitz Edwards as Te Hunchback
Monte Collins as Father Zaspard

References

External links 
 
 

1924 films
Silent American drama films
1924 drama films
Paramount Pictures films
Films directed by George Melford
Lost American films
American black-and-white films
American silent feature films
1924 lost films
Lost drama films
Famous Players-Lasky films
1920s American films